Józef Henryk Kallenbach (24 November 1861 – 12 September 1929), born in Kamianets-Podilskyi, was a Polish historian of literature.

Kallenbach graduated from the IV Public Male Gymnasium Jan Długosz of old-classical type in Lwów. He was a professor of Polish literary history at Lwów University (since 1904) and Jagiellon University. He was also a professor at the universities in Freiburg, Warsaw, and Wilno, a member of the Akademia Umiejętności, and a director of the Czartoryski Museum and Library in Kraków.

He lectured about Polish pre-partitions literature and romanticism. During his work in Lwów he examined the works of Adam Mickiewicz, Zygmunt Krasiński, and Juliusz Słowacki. Some of his most notable works refer to the literature of Old Poland.

Although Kallenbach died in Kraków, he was buried on Lychakivskiy Cemetery, as he considered himself tied with Lwów.

External links

Polish male writers
Members of the Lwów Scientific Society
1861 births
1929 deaths
People from Kamianets-Podilskyi
People from Kamenets-Podolsky Uyezd
Rectors of the Jagiellonian University
Commanders of the Order of Polonia Restituta
Burials at Lychakiv Cemetery